Necrofobia is a 2014 Argentine horror thriller film directed by Daniel de la Vega. It stars Luis Machín, Raúl Taibo, Viviana Saccone, Gerardo Romano and Julieta Cardinali.

References

2014 films
Argentine horror thriller films
2014 horror thriller films
Films directed by Daniel de la Vega
2010s Argentine films